Bernard Francis Dunster (March 24, 1921 – April 8, 1995) was a Canadian ice hockey player. He was a member of the Ottawa RCAF Flyers who won the gold medal in ice hockey for Canada at the 1948 Winter Olympics in St. Moritz. He died in Ottawa in 1995.

References

External links
DatabaseOlympics.com Bio
RCAF Flyers team profile

1921 births
1995 deaths
Ice hockey people from Ottawa
Ice hockey players at the 1948 Winter Olympics
Medalists at the 1948 Winter Olympics
Olympic gold medalists for Canada
Olympic ice hockey players of Canada
Olympic medalists in ice hockey
Canadian ice hockey players